New Women's Press (NWP) was an independent book publisher founded in Auckland, New Zealand in 1982. New Women's Press's mandate was to publish books "by, for, and about women."  Wendy Harrex ran New Women's Press for 11 years. Over that time, NWP published over 70 titles of non-fiction, fiction and poetry, as well as an annual diary, Herstory, that highlighted groups of New Zealand women. The Haeata Collective of Māori women artists was originally founded to produce a Herstory edition for NWP. NWP also published the first anthology of New Zealand women's fiction, which was edited by Cathie Dunsford.

The Broadsheet feminist magazine and NWP celebrated a joint anniversary (Broadsheet'''s twentieth and NWP's tenth) on 19 September 1992, with a Suffrage Day event in Auckland, attended by more than 200 women. The event was part of the Listener Women's Book Festival, and was also the launch of Been Around for Quite a While. Speakers included Pat Rosier, Sandra Coney, Wendy Harrex, Stephanie Johnson and Sheridan Keith. 

In an article surveying the state of women's publishing in New Zealand, Laurel Bergmann describes New Women's Press as "an important part of the process of legitimation of women fiction writers", particularly due to the New Women's Fiction'' anthology series that provided opportunities to new writers to publish alongside established voices. Janet Wilson has noted that this anthology series "confirmed the development of a new market and readership" for writing by women.

List of Publications

References 

1982 establishments in New Zealand
Publishing companies established in 1982